"Be Happy" is the debut single by American social media personality Dixie D'Amelio, released on June 26, 2020, through Hitco and Dam Fam as the lead single from her debut studio album A Letter to Me.

"Be Happy" peaked at number 55 on the UK Singles Chart and 56 on the Canadian Hot 100 chart. It was written by Billy Mann, Christian Medice, Samantha DeRosa, and Albert Azo (2A).

Background and composition
Days after the song's release, on July 1, the official music video was released on D'Amelio's YouTube channel. The lyrics are about mental illness and depression. In a Sirius XM interview, Dixie reveals her song is to help others realize "they don't need to pretend that life is so perfect and it is okay to have a bad day." 
She first released an a cappella version on TikTok. She worked with producer Christian Medice in a virtual studio. The song was co-written by Medice, Sam DeRosa and Billy Mann. The pop song features an upbeat tune which is sampled from house building theme from Red Dead Redemption 2. The song amassed over 1 million videos and 1 billion views on TikTok shortly after its release, with promotion from her younger sister Charli D'Amelio, the most-followed individual on TikTok. In an MTV interview, D'Amelio says she joked around with new friend, Lil Mosey, about collaborating on the song. This joke turned into the real deal and a remix version of "Be Happy" was created.  On September 9, 2020, a remix of the song featuring singer-songwriter Blackbear and rapper Lil Mosey was released. The official music video for the "Be Happy" remix was released via D'Amelio's Youtube channel September 20, 2020. Social media personality Noah Beck played singer D'Amelio's love interest in the music video.

Charts

Certifications

References

2020 debut singles
2020 songs
Dixie D'Amelio songs
Songs about the COVID-19 pandemic
Songs written by Billy Mann